The Africa Movie Academy Award for Best Short Film, officially known as Efere Ozako Award for Best Short Film, is an annual merit by the Africa Film Academy to reward the best short films for the year. It was introduced in the 4th Africa Movie Academy Awards, but no film was rewarded because the jury didn't deem any of the nominee fit for the award. No submitted film was nominated for the award in 2009.  At the 10th Africa Movie Academy Awards, the award category was renamed to honor the memory of renowned entertainment lawyer Efere Ozako.

References

Lists of award winners
Africa Movie Academy Awards